Sukunka Falls Provincial Park is a provincial park in British Columbia, Canada.

External links

Peace River Regional District
Provincial parks of British Columbia
Protected areas established in 1981
1981 establishments in British Columbia